Saratovka may refer to:
 Saratovka, Armenia
 Saratovka, Azerbaijan
 Saratovka, Kazakhstan